Stanton Babcock (January 12, 1904 – March 10, 1979) was an American equestrian. He competed in two events at the 1936 Summer Olympics.

Family
He was the son of Brigadier General Conrad Stanton Babcock (1876-1950) who was buried at Arlington National Cemetery and the father of actress Barbara Babcock.

References

External links
 

1904 births
1979 deaths
American male equestrians
Olympic equestrians of the United States
Equestrians at the 1936 Summer Olympics
People from Fort Leavenworth, Kansas